The KEX Hotel is a hotel at the intersection of Northeast Martin Luther King Jr. Boulevard and Couch Street in Portland, Oregon, United States. Kex is based in Reykjavík, and the Portland location is the brand's first hotel outside Iceland. The hotel is unconnected in any way to Portland radio station KEX (1190).

History 
The hotel closed temporarily during the COVID-19 pandemic, reopening in June 2021.

KEX Hotel featured Dóttir, until the restaurant closed on January 1, 2022.

References

External links

 

Hotels in Portland, Oregon
Kerns, Portland, Oregon
Northeast Portland, Oregon